The Sky Swatter (sometimes Sky Swat) was a thrill ride which was built by S&S Power of Logan, Utah. It was marketed from 2003 to 2010; only two Sky Swatters were manufactured. The first installation of a Sky Swatter was as SWAT at Six Flags AstroWorld in Houston, Texas, which operated from 2003 until the park permanently closed at the end of the 2005 season. The ride then was moved to Six Flags New England and operated from 2006 through 2012 as Catapult. The other Sky Swatter operated as Slammer at Thorpe Park from 2005 until the ride closed permanently in May 2017.

History
S&S Worldwide (then S&S Power) introduced the Sky Swatter at its Logan factory on October 3, 2002, as the company's first true flat ride. The ride made its debut at Six Flags AstroWorld as SWAT for the 2003 season. On 28 March 2005, Thorpe Park, near London, England, introduced a Sky Swatter as Slammer, which was the second and final Sky Swatter to be manufactured.

At the end of its operating season, Six Flags AstroWorld closed permanently on October 30, 2005. Several AstroWorld rides were relocated to other Six Flags parks between 2006 and 2010. Six Flags New England received two, both of which began operation for the 2006 season: SWAT (renamed to Catapult) and Diablo Falls (a spinning river rapids ride, renamed to Splash Water Falls).

In 2010, Larsen MacColl acquired a majority share of the company from Stan Checketts and S&S Worldwide discontinued the Sky Swatter. Following the loss of support, Catapult at Six Flags New England was removed in March 2013, prior to its 2013 operating season, leaving Slammer at Thorpe Park as the only operating Sky Swatter. In 2017, after major downtime, Slammer finally closed on 4 May to make way for other attractions.

Design and ride experience

The concept for the Sky Swatter was developed by S&S CEO Stan Checketts starting in 1993; the restraints took an entire year to design, while the structure and ride only took five months. The Sky Swatter featured a long arm which sat between two towers, on either end of the arm were four rows of six seats; total throughput was estimated at 800 to 900 riders per hour. The restraints consisted of a side-lowering lap bar and partially over-the-shoulder restraints, a restraint system also found on other S&S's attractions, Screamin' Swing and Sky Sling rides. The floor was ventilated, allowing air and small objects to escape through it.

When the Sky Swatter began operation, the arm was lifted to the top of the towers, where it then began to spin. As the arm spun between the two towers, riders orbited either up or down around the center. After a few flips, the ride reversed and flipped in the opposite direction.

Installations

Slammer

Slammer was the second and final S&S Power Sky Swatter to be built, and the only one installed in Europe. It debuted on 28 March 2005 at Thorpe Park.

Slammer was plagued with reliability issues starting from its opening in 2005; the ride would get stuck with the arm locked at the top of the tower. The opening of the ride was delayed from the park's opening day (March 26) to March 28, and shut down for more than two weeks following a fault on the second day of operation. In another incident during the 2006 season, the levelling mechanism failed on March 18, leaving riders trapped at a 45 degree angle.

Slammer was closed before the end of the 2010 season and had faults preventing the full lift of the arm at the start of 2011. Between 2012 and 2014, Slammer went through major downtime. For 2012, Slammer did not open until October. All signage for the ride was removed at the end of 2012, giving the impression that Thorpe Park was not planning to open the ride anytime soon. For Fright Nights in 2013, the ride was completely removed from the actual park map which suggested the ride was going to close. However, at the start of the 2014 season, the ride could be seen testing with sand-filled dummies, suggesting that the ride would open again.

Slammer was operational for the 2015 season starting in May, opening later than the rest of the park and closing when the park closed. The ride was also closed at 3 pm for a 15-minute inspection. Even though the ride was operational, Slammer ceased operation in the park occasionally due to technical or mechanical errors. Slammer remained closed for the duration of that year's Fright Nights, but could be seen operating occasionally before it was closed for the season on October 15.

Slammer had a successful 2016 season, with the ride being one of the more reliable rides in the park for that year. On Wednesday, October 26, Slammer gave its final rides of the season.

Shortly after the 2017 season started in April, Thorpe Park announced Slammer was closed for the season, likely due to continued technical issues. On May 4, 2017, after 12 years service at the resort, Thorpe Park stated Slammer would be closed permanently and instead would be removed to make way for future attractions.

In 2021, "Black Mirror Labyrinth" is set to utilise the rides queue, and the abandoned ride system has been left as scenery.

Catapult (SWAT) 

SWAT was one of two new rides added to Six Flags AstroWorld for the 2003 season; a press release from February touted the unique installation.

SWAT was moved to Six Flags New England from AstroWorld after that park closed on October 30, 2005; at New England, the ride was renamed Catapult, and opened for the 2006 season. It operated sporadically through 2006 and 2007 due to maintenance issues, and the park announced it would not return for the 2008 season; however, the restraint system was rehabilitated and it operated with greater reliability from 2008 until it was removed in March 2013, prior to the 2013 season.

References

External links

 Slammer at Thorpe Park Resort
 
 
  in operation at Logan, Utah

S&S – Sansei Technologies
Amusement rides introduced in 2003
Amusement rides that closed in 2017
Buildings and structures demolished in 2017
Six Flags AstroWorld